Britannia Pier is a pier located at the seaside town of Great Yarmouth in the English county of Norfolk.

History

Planning and construction
A new pier in Great Yarmouth was first proposed in 1856 with building work commencing in September 1857 with engineer, surveyor and antiquary Alfred William Morant (1828–81) as the designer. A. W. Morant went on to become City Surveyor for Norwich.

Original pier
The completed pier opened on 13 July 1858 at cost of £6000 and was originally 700 feet long but this length was reduced by about 80 feet in 1859 when the sloop James and Jessie collided with the structure during the Royal Charter Storm. The length was again reduced as the result of storm damage in 1868. The pier was demolished in 1899.

New pier

The building of a new pier was commenced on 13 December 1900 to a design by engineers Joseph and Arthur Mayoh. This 810 foot pier deck with a temporary Pavilion  at the pier's far end opened in 1901 with the temporary Pavilion eventually being replaced with a Grand Pavilion which opened on 21 June 1902. This Grand Pavilion was destroyed in a fire on 22 December 1909. A second Pavilion designed by Douglass & Arnott was completed in 1910 but this too was to burn down on 17 April 1914 as a result of an arson attack by militant suffragettes Hilda Burkitt and Florence Tunks, both of whom received prison sentences. A third Pavilion was hastily constructed and opened on 27 July 1914.

Damage and closure
The pier's Floral Hall Ballroom opened in May 1928 but was destroyed by fire in August 1932. A new Grand Ballroom opened in 1933, but this too was destroyed by fire in April 1954, along with the third Pavilion. The pier was closed and sectioned during World War II and re-opened in 1947 after essential repairs including replacing sections removed during wartime to prevent enemy troops using the pier as a landing station.

Post war
The present Pavilion opened on 27 June 1958 and was home to the Pavilion Theatre (today called the Britannia Pier Theatre), but the Ballroom (called the Ocean Ballroom from 1947) was never replaced.

Facilities
Britannia Pier was previously owned by First Leisure plc. It was purchased by Family Amusements Ltd who also own the Wellington Pier further south along the seafront. In 2022 it was purchased by Triangle Amusements. Today the pier continues to provide live theatre shows and has a variety of food outlets, bars, amusements and fairground rides.

References

External links
Britannia Pier official website
Britannia Pier, Great Yarmouth - Historic England database

Piers in Norfolk
Pier fires
Buildings and structures in Norfolk
Great Yarmouth
Tourist attractions in Norfolk
Buildings and structures completed in 1858
Buildings and structures demolished in 1899
1932 fires in the United Kingdom
Burned buildings and structures in the United Kingdom